Twilightfall is the first demo by Ukrainian black metal band Nokturnal Mortum. This release had a more doom metallic sound not to be heard on any other album. It was re-released in 2004 on CD by Oriana Productions with a different cover art.

Track listing 

 Notes
 Lyrics have not been published for any of the songs.

References 

1995 albums
Nokturnal Mortum albums